Bush Ait is an island of Clewer, Berkshire in the Thames on the reach above Boveney Lock at the mouth of the Clewer Mill Stream which leads to Windsor Racecourse Marina. The island is unpopulated and wooded.

See also
Islands in the River Thames
Ait

References

Islands of Berkshire
Islands of the River Thames